Honda CB500 twins were a family of medium-sized standard motorcycles produced by Honda from 1993 until 2003. Because of their low cost, reliability, and good handling they were popular with commuters, and Motorcycle couriers. They were also raced in the United Kingdom in the Honda CB500 Cup (changed its name in 2009 to the Thundersport 500 when Suzuki GS500 and Kawasaki ER-5 were included).

The half-faired Honda CB500S was introduced in 1998. Production of the first CB500 twin range ceased in 2003 as the engines could not meet Euro 2 emission regulations.

One motorcycle was tested by Moto Revue from 1993 through 1996. At  only the cam chain and the pistons were replaced, although, in the tester's opinion, it could have run with the original parts for longer with no problems.

Model history 

1994: CB500R naked version launched. Rear drum brake. Nissin front disk brake. Made in Japan.

1995: No change

1996: CB500T. No significant changes.  Some CB500Ts made in Italy.

1996, November: CB500V. Brakes changed to Brembo. Rear drum brake changed to disk. Silver wheels. CB500 cup race series introduced. Special silver model with cup logo introduced.  Production moved to Italy.

1998: CB500W naked version. CB500SW 'sport' half-faired version with new headlight introduced. New instruments and handlebar layout.

1998, December: CB500X, CB500SX. No technical changes.

2000 through 2003: CB500Y, CB500SY.  No technical changes.

Specification (CB500Y 2003)

References 

CB500 twin
Standard motorcycles
Sport bikes
Motorcycles introduced in 1993
Motorcycles powered by straight-twin engines